"The Anomalous" is an American television series created, co-written, and executive produced by Chuk Otakpor and Richard Odilu for CeeRO World Productions. Set in Lagos, The Anomalous is a television drama that follows the professional practice of two young psychologists, Dr. Kelenna (Michael Uchegbu) and Dr. Oluchi (Keira Hewatch), a husband and wife team – whose own demons are brought to the fore while striving to help others face theirs.

Plot 
Dr. Kelenna (Michael Uchegbu) and Dr. Oluchi (Keira Hewatch) are behavioral psychotherapists confronted with mostly bizarre clinical cases that put their skills on trial while trying to grow their relatively young business in an environment that seldom defies logic. Having worked hard and successfully in separating their business and personal life, the fabric holding it together comes apart at the seams with one wrong move creating a domino effect.

Cast and characters 

 Michael Uchegbu as Dr. Kelenna Ikenna, a psychologist and husband to Dr. Oluchi Ikenna.
 Keira Hewatch as Dr. Oluchi Ikenna, a psychologist and wife to Dr. Kelenna Ikenna.
 Frankincense Eche-Ben as Yemi Adelaja, Drs. Oluchi and Ikenna's client
 Clem Ohameze as Dr. Chukwudi Ikenna, Dr. Kelenna's father
 Ronnie Dikko as Mrs. Adelaja, Yemi's mother
 Ifeanyi Kalu as Chinedu Obajuru, Drs. Oluchi and Ikenna's client and a media consultant
 Felix Ugo Omokhodion as Eghosa, Drs. Oluchi and Ikenna's client
 Azizat Sadiq as Ehi, Drs. Oluchi and Ikenna's client and boutique owner
 Peace Oni as Aisha, Drs. Oluchi and Ikenna's Assistant 
 Lucy Ameh as Freda, Ehi's older sister
 Stephen Damian as Ojimaojo, Ehi's ex-boyfriend
 Dan Ugoji as Williams, Ehi's boyfriend
 Ogee Nelson as Tito, Eghosa's ex-girlfriend
 Genny Uzoma as Chibundu Obajuru, Chinedu's sister
 Rita Edward as Mama Eghosa, Eghosa's mother
 Bryan Okoye as Ebuka, Yemi's friend
 David Jones as Barrister Bello Osagie
 Roxy Antak as Victor, Eghosa's best friend
 Emmanuel Ilemobayo as Jallo, Victor's best friend
 Bridget Chigbufue as Interviewer
 Genoveva Umeh as Young Oluchi
 Chimezie Imo as Young Ekene, Young Oluchi's cousin and best friend
 Hakeem Rahman as Papa Ade, Eghosa and Mama Eghosa's cantankerous neighbor
 Emeka Okoye as Prophet Bedazzle
 Bukky Thomas as Mama Ade, Papa Ade's wife
 Isioma Momah as Nkemdilichukwu, Chinedu's cousin
 Joy Nmezi as Abebe, call girl

Release 
The series will premiere on 31 December 2022.

Accolades

The first season of the series has received eight nominations and eight wins in some film festivals. It is in the Best Series category at the Skiptown Playhouse International Film Festival, 2020 which will take place in June, 2021. Also, it received three nominations at the New Vision International Film Festival, Amsterdam for Best Actress (Keira Hewatch), Best Actor (Michael Uchegbu) and Best Series. It won the September award for Best Pilot at the Cyrus International Film Festival of Toronto, 2020, and the September, 2020 award for Best Episodic at Phoenix Monthly Short Film Festival.

Michael Uchegbu was awarded the Best Actor at Hollywood International Golden Age Festival, 2020 September edition. At the November 2020 edition of the Indie Short Fest Los Angeles Film Festival the series was nominated for Best Web Series/TV Pilot, Best Original Score, Best Costume Design, and Best Makeup and Hairstyling, and it won for Best Original Score and Best Makeup and Hairstyling. Also, Indie Fest awarded the series Award of Recognition in African-American Film, Television - Pilot Program, and Television - Program/Series at its 2020 Indie Fest Film Awards.

References

2021 American television series debuts
Upcoming television series